Philip Albert "Stompie" de Wet (born 14 February 1989 in Kuruman, South Africa) is a former South African rugby union player, that played first class rugby with the  from 2011 to 2014. His regular position was flanker.

Career

Youth and Varsity Cup rugby

While playing school rugby for Grey College in Bloemfontein, De Wet was selected for the  Under-16 side that played at the 2005 Grant Khomo Week.

He was part of the  sides that played in the 2009 and 2010 Under-21 Provincial Championships.

Leopards

He played first class rugby since 2011.

He was included in the Leopards' Currie Cup side for the 2011 Currie Cup Premier Division season and made his debut in this competition on 22 July 2011 in their match against  as his side crashed to a 9–47 defeat.

After three more appearances in the 2013 Vodacom Cup, De Wet scored seven tries in just six appearances in the 2012 Currie Cup First Division. Two tries in eight appearances followed in the 2013 Currie Cup First Division (both those tries coming in their match against the ) and he was also included in their squad for the 2014 Currie Cup qualification tournament.

References

South African rugby union players
Living people
1989 births
People from John Taolo Gaetsewe District Municipality
Rugby union flankers
Leopards (rugby union) players
Rugby union players from the Northern Cape